The 1943 meeting of the Bishops' Council of the Russian Orthodox Church held on September 8, 1943, was the first sobor of the Russian Orthodox Church since the 1917–18 Local Council.

The assembly unanimously elected Metropolitan Sergius of Moscow and Kolomna to be the Patriarch of Moscow and all Rus'.

The assembly also excommunicated everyone who collaborated with the Axis powers, and reestablished the Holy Synod of the Russian Orthodox Church.

Participants
The assembly was attended by 19 bishops: all the bishops of the Russian Orthodox Church who at that time held their positions on the territories not occupied by Nazi troops, except Bishop Photius (Topiro) of Kuban and Krasnodar, whose reasons of absence are unknown, and Archbishop Barlaam (Pikalov) of Sverdlovsk, assigned to his office from the Komi ASSR field-crop-walkers one day before the opening of the Council. Besides the bishops Archpriest Nikolai Kolchitsky, rector of the Yelokhovo Cathedral in Moscow also participated in the assembly. He became a Synod member as the head on the Property Management Directorate of the Moscow Patriarchate.

 Sergius (Stragorodsky), Metropolitan of Moscow and Kolomna, locum tenens of the patriarchal throne
 Alexius (Simansky), Metropolitan of Leningrad
 Nicholas (Yarushevich), Metropolitan of Kiev and Galich
 Luke (Voyno-Yasenetsky), Archbishop of Krasnoyarsk
 John (Bratolyubov), Archbishop of Sarapul
 Andrew (Komarov), Archbishop of Kazan
 Alexius (Palitsyn), Archbishop of Kuybyshev
 Stephen (Protsenko), Archbishop of Ufa
 Sergius (Grishin), Archbishop of Gorky and Arzamas
 John (Sokolov), Archbishop of Yaroslavl and Rostov
 Aleksius (Sergeyev), Archbishop of Ryazan
 Basil (Ratmirov), Archbishop of Smolensk and Kalinin
 Bartholomew (Gorodtsov), Archbishop of Novosibirsk and Barnaul
 Gregory (Chukov), Archbishop of Saratov and Stalingrad
 Alexander (Tolstopyatov), Bishop of Molotov
 Pitirim (Sviridov), Bishop of Kursk
 Benjamin (Tikhonitsky), Bishop of Kirov
 Demetrius (Gradusov), Bishop of Ulyanovsk
 Eleutherius (Vorontsov), Bishop of Rostov

See also
 Local Council of the Russian Orthodox Church
 1945 Local Council of the Russian Orthodox Church

References

Russian Orthodox Church in Russia
History of the Russian Orthodox Church
20th-century Eastern Orthodoxy
1943 in Christianity
1943 in the Soviet Union
Joseph Stalin
Eastern Orthodoxy in the Soviet Union